Brahim Takioullah (born 26 January 1982) is a Moroccan man who formerly held the Guinness World Record for largest feet and is officially the second-tallest living person.

Personal life 
Takioullah was born in Guelmim, Morocco, in 1982. At the age of 18, he had been asked by his school doctor to get a blood test, for his "unusual" size. After obtaining his university degree in geography, a French doctor brought Takioullah to Paris in 2006, for treatment.
His treatment was successful as his tumour was removed and the growth hormone level in his blood was brought down to normal. His heart was also reported in a good condition.

Takioullah had difficulties finding a pair of European size-58 shoes. He once asked a cobbler to make him a pair of made-to-measure shoes, but he was told that they would cost up to 3,500 euros. His orthopedic podiatrist, Jerome Liegeon, fitted him with a specially made pair of shoes, specifically designed to support his weight. People can take pictures with Brahim, who has now also obtained French nationality.

Records 
Surpassing former record-holder, Sultan Kösen, Takioullah became the Guinness World Record holder for world's largest feet on a living person, on 24 May 2011. His left foot measures , and his right .

See also 
 List of tallest people
 Guinness World Records

References

External links 
 Largest feet on a living person - Guinness World Records

1982 births
Living people
People with gigantism
People from Guelmim
Moroccan emigrants to France